Premonition is the ninth studio album by English musician Peter Frampton and the follow up to 1982's The Art of Control.  This album featured Frampton's hit from the 1980s, "Lying" and the single "All Eyes on You".

Track listing

Personnel
Peter Frampton – guitar, vocals; Yamaha CS-80 synthesizer and bass on "Stop" and "Lying"
Tony Levin – bass; Chapman Stick on "Call of the Wild"
Richard Cottle – keyboards
Omar Hakim, Steve Ferrone – drums
Chuck Kirkpatrick, Johnne Sambataro – backing vocals
Pete Solley – piano on "Stop"
Richie Puente – percussion on "Hiding from a Heartache" and "All Eyes on You"

References

1986 albums
Peter Frampton albums
Virgin Records albums
Albums produced by Peter Frampton
Atlantic Records albums